Terrance James Reid (born 13 November 1949) is an English rock vocalist and guitarist. He has performed with high-profile musicians, as a supporting act, session musician, and sideman.

Biography

Reid was born in Paxton Park Maternity Home, Little Paxton, St Neots, Huntingdonshire, England. He lived in the village of Bluntisham and attended St Ivo School, St Ives. After leaving school at the age of fifteen, Reid joined Peter Jay and the Jaywalkers after being spotted by the band's drummer, Peter Jay. At the time, Reid was playing for a local band, The Redbeats, who regularly performed at the River Club in St Ives.

His public profile was enhanced in 1966 when The Jaywalkers were named as a supporting act for the Rolling Stones during their 23-show British Tour from September to October 1966. At the concert at the Royal Albert Hall, Graham Nash of The Hollies became friends with Reid and suggested The Jaywalkers sign up with UK Columbia Records—an EMI label—to record with producer John Burgess. Their first single, the soul-inspired "The Hand Don't Fit the Glove" was a minor hit in 1967, but by then The Jaywalkers had decided to disband.

Reid came to the attention of producer Mickie Most, who became his manager and who was in partnership with Peter Grant at the time. His first single with Most, "Better By Far", became a radio favourite, but the album, Bang Bang, You're Terry Reid, was not a commercial success. With accompanying musicians Peter Solley on organ and Keith Webb on drums, a 1968 tour of the United States with Cream did much to gain Reid a loyal following. His final performance of the tour at the Miami Pop Festival garnered positive reviews from the music press.

The song "Without Expression", from Bang Bang, You're Terry Reid, written by Reid at age 14, was recorded by The Hollies in 1968 as "A Man With No Expression", by Crosby, Stills, Nash and Young in 1969 as "Horses Through a Rainstorm", by REO Speedwagon in 1973 as "Without Expression (Don't Be the Man)", and by John Mellencamp on his greatest hits album The Best That I Could Do: 1978–1988, again with the parenthetical "Don't Be the Man", with Nash singing lead on the first two. "Horses Through a Rainstorm" was slated to appear on Déjà Vu before being replaced at the last minute by Stephen Stills's "Carry On". Both versions were not released until years later.

Yardbirds guitarist Jimmy Page, managed by Peter Grant, became interested in Reid's work, and when The Yardbirds disbanded, Page wanted Reid to fill the vocalist spot for his proposed new group, the New Yardbirds, which was to become Led Zeppelin. Reid had already committed to go on the road for two tours with the Rolling Stones and another with Cream (as an opening act on the 1968 US Tour). Reid suggested to Page that if he were compensated for the gig fees he would lose and if Page would call Keith Richards to explain why Reid had to pull out of the US tours, Reid would try some things out with Page. It never happened and Reid told Page to consider a young Birmingham-based singer, Robert Plant, instead, having previously seen Plant's Band of Joy as a support act at one of his concerts. Reid also suggested Page check out their drummer John Bonham. Reid also rejected an offer from Ritchie Blackmore to replace the departing Rod Evans in Deep Purple.

In 1969, Reid supported British tours, notably Jethro Tull and Fleetwood Mac. Reid, Solley and Webb toured the United States again when he opened for the Rolling Stones on their 1969 American Tour. He did not appear at the infamous Rolling Stones concert at Altamont Music Festival.

1970s–present
In December 1969, Reid had a falling out with producer Mickie Most, who wanted Reid to become a balladeer and strictly follow Most's own formula. Before this, Reid had toured extensively in major venues in the US, including two tours with the Rolling Stones and another with Cream (he also performed at Mick and Bianca Jagger's wedding in Saint-Tropez in 1971).
Unable to record or release his music, Reid concentrated on live work, mostly in the US whilst awaiting the outcome of litigation with Most, making only sporadic UK performances during that period. In 1970, he returned briefly to England to perform at the Isle of Wight Festival with bass player Lee Miles (a former member of Ike & Tina Turner's band whom Reid met while touring the US with the Stones), David Lindley and Tim Davis. During this period he also took part in the second Atlanta International Pop Festival, and was filmed performing at Glastonbury in 1971. That same year, Reid was signed by Ahmet Ertegun to Atlantic Records, with his band consisting of David Lindley, Lee Miles and Alan White; they began recording in the UK and later switched to the US. White left to join Yes and Lindley left to tour with Jackson Browne. However, Lee Miles remained and was Reid's trusty sidekick for many years to come. Other musicians on the album, titled River, included Conrad Isidore on drums and Willie Bobo on percussion. Produced by Reid, engineered by Tom Dowd, and mixed by Eddie Offord this third album was released in 1973 and received favourable reviews, but failed commercially. The remainder of the material from those extensive sessions was released in 2016 as The Other Side of The River.

Over the next decade, Reid switched to different labels in search of a winning formula. Seed of Memory was released by ABC Records in 1976, and produced by Graham Nash (ABC filed for bankruptcy the week the album was released), and Rogue Waves was produced by Chris Kimsey for Capitol Records in 1979. Reid retired his solo career in 1981 to concentrate on session work, appearing on albums by Don Henley, Jackson Browne and Bonnie Raitt. In 1991, Reid returned with producer Trevor Horn for the WEA album The Driver. The album featured a cover version "Gimme Some Lovin'" which also appeared on the soundtrack for the Tom Cruise movie Days of Thunder by Tony Scott. In the 1990s, he also toured the US and Hong Kong with Mick Taylor.  "Rich Kid Blues" was the eponymous song on an album released by Marianne Faithfull, produced by Mike Leander in 1984 but unreleased for 14 years. Reid and friends put together an informal group in March 1993, calling themselves The Flew.  Members included Reid, Joe Walsh, Nicky Hopkins, Rick Rosas, and Phil Jones.  They played one show at The Coach House in San Juan Capistrano.  This was Nicky Hopkins' last public performance before his passing.

In late 2002, Reid returned to the UK with longtime bass player Lee Miles for three shows at the [WOMAD] festival near Reading, his first live appearance in years. In 2005 he returned for a UK tour with London shows at The 100 Club and Ronnie Scott's. One venue billed him as 'The Man with a Hell of a Story To Tell'. This began a run of regular visits by Reid, who has toured the UK every year since. For appearances at festivals and his London shows, Reid uses a full band and venues have included The Jazz Cafe, The Borderline, The 100 Club, Dingwalls, The Half Moon and notably an invite to return to Ronnie Scott's in 2009 for a week long residency as part of their 50th anniversary (one of only 6 non-jazz acts to do so). This became Reid's favourite venue and he had residencies there for several years after. In 2012, his album Live in London featured an entire set from one of these gigs at Ronnie Scott's, and was released with no remixes or overdubs. Reid's UK band regularly attracts the best UK session players (Ash Soan - drums, BJ Cole - pedal steel, Dzal Martin -guitar, Mark Smith - bass, David Tench - piano). Between 2002 and 2012, Reid appeared at the Glastonbury Festival several times and many other festivals: The Isle of Wight, The Secret Garden (twice), The Rhythm Festival (twice),  and All Tomorrows Parties. Also during this period, EMI produced the Superlungs box set of his first two albums and all his sessions for them recorded between 1966 and 1970. Also Seed of Memory and River became available on CD and a new live album, Alive was released by Sanctuary Records, having previously been available from Reid himself, who made 200 copies to sell at WOMAD 2002.  Around this time Reid began a residency at The Joint in Los Angeles, this became "Big Monday' and ran for four years, with many of his friends dropping by when they were in town including Robert Plant, Keith Richards, Bobby Womack, Roger Daltrey, and Eric Burdon.

His song "Dean" from the River album was used in the feature film The Criminal produced 1999 and released in 2001. Reid became good friends with the film's producer Chris Johnson who also become Reid's business advisor and persuaded Reid to return live work in the US in early 2000's and arranging UK tours, recruiting players for his band, arranging collaborations with other artists, organising back catalogue releases, licensing his songs for films and even an acting role. In 2003 Johnson placed three of Reid's songs, "Seed of Memory", "To Be Treated Rite", and "Brave Awakening" in the movie The Devil's Rejects directed by Rob Zombie. Also his song "Faith To Arise" was in the 2003 film Wonderland and in the 2017 film Win It All. In 2009, his song 'Be Yourself", which he wrote for Graham Nash's Songs For Beginners, appeared in the Jason Reitman film Up in the Air (2009). In the 2005 Bill Paxton movie The Greatest Game Ever Played, Reid played a golf caddy.

In July/August 2007, Reid returned for another six-week UK tour being backed by The Cosmic American Derelicts, a band out of northern New Jersey and southern New York, and their guitar player Eddie Rainey became a member of Reid's band for three or so years. On 26 June 2009, Reid appeared with Rainey at Great Yarmouth club, The Residence, where Reid was reunited with Peter Jay for the first time in over 15 years.

Reid is popular with newer artists as a collaborator; the pairing of Shine (a French trip-hop act) and Reid led to him spending a week in Paris to record several tracks as guest vocalist. They played a one-off at the Pigalle Club in London on 26 August 2009. Shine featuring Terry Reid was released as an EP in November 2009. Reid was in San Francisco lending his voice to the track "Listen" by DJ Shadow as one of a few bonus tracks added to his best of album. Another collaboration has yet to see the light of day: "All God's Children Need Dancing Shoes" with Alabama 3 after they shared a stage at the Rhythm Festival.

Reid is acknowledged by Robert Plant as the outstanding voice of his generation and an influence on Led Zeppelin's early material and is credited by Jimmy Page for connecting him to Robert Plant. Reid's early song "Rich Kid Blues" was covered on an album by Marianne Faithfull in 1984. The UK artist Rumer recorded "Brave Awakening" on her Boys Don't Cry 2012 album and appeared at his London shows at the Jazz Cafe and Half Moon. Cheap Trick recorded Reid's "Speak Now" for their 1977 debut album. The Raconteurs with Jack White also recorded a version of Reid's "Rich Kid Blues" for their second album Consolers of the Lonely in 2008. The American rock group The Split Squad recorded a cover of Reid's "Tinker Taylor" for their debut album, Now Hear This..., released in 2014. Joe Perry's album Sweetzerland Manifesto, released in 2018, features three tracks co-written and sung by Reid. In 2020, a recording of Chris Cornell covering Reid's "To Be Treated Rite" was released on his posthumous album No One Sings Like You Anymore, Vol. 1, which also included a cover of Stay with Me Baby based on Reid's own version.

Discography

Studio albums
 Bang, Bang You're Terry Reid (1968)
 Terry Reid (1969) (US title: Move Over for Terry Reid)
 River (1973)
 Seed of Memory (1976)
 Rogue Waves (1979)
 The Driver (1991)
 The Other Side of the River (2016)

Compilations
 Super Lungs: The Complete Studio EMI Recordings 1966–1969 (2004)
 The Most of Terry Reid (1969) MFP5220

Live albums
 The Hand Don't Fit the Glove (1985)
 Alive (2004)
 Silver White Light – Live at the Isle of Wight 1970 (2004)
 Live in London (2013)

Filmography
 Glastonbury Fayre (1972) Directed by Nicolas Roeg features "Dean", an extended jam with Linda Lewis). The drummer in the band at the time was Alan White who would later join 'Yes'; lap-steel player David Lindley later worked with Ry Cooder and Jackson Browne.
 Days of Thunder (1990) directed by Tony Scott features "Gimme Some Lovin'"
 The Criminal, produced 1999 and released in 2001, featured his song "Dean" from the 'River album. Reid became good friends with the film's producer Chris Johnson who also become Reid's business advisor,
 Wonderland (2003) features "Faith to Arise" and "Dean"
 The Devil's Rejects (2005) Directed by Rob Zombie features "Brave Awakening", "To Be Treated Rite" and "Seed of Memory"
 Groupies – Cherry Red Films – 1970 performance and backstage footage in San Francisco:  "Bang Bang" and "Superlungs My Supergirl"
 The Summit (2013 documentary) features "July" over the closing credits.
 Superlungs (2016) a feature-length documentary based on the life and music career of Terry Reid.
 3 from Hell'' (2019) Directed by Rob Zombie. "Faith to Arise" is played over the end credits.  "The Frame" is heard on the car radio.

References

External links
 
 

1949 births
Living people
English rock guitarists
English male guitarists
English songwriters
English rock singers
People from Huntingdon
Columbia Graphophone Company artists
Epic Records artists
Musicians from Cambridgeshire
English session musicians
British male songwriters